The men's coxed pair was one of the competitions in the Rowing at the 1900 Summer Olympics events in Paris. It was held on 25 August and 26 August 1900. 7 boats, involving 22 rowers from 3 nations, competed. The event was won by a mixed team; Minerva Amsterdam's Dutch crew replaced its coxswain with a local French boy for the final. François Brandt and Roelof Klein were the rowers, with Hermanus Brockmann the cox in the semifinals; the French cox is unknown. Second and third places both went to French boats; Société nautique de la Marne (Lucien Martinet, René Waleff, and an unknown cox) took silver while Rowing Club Castillon (Carlos Deltour, Antoine Védrenne, and cox Raoul Paoli) earned bronze.

Background

This was the first appearance of the event. Rowing had been on the programme in 1896 but was cancelled due to bad weather. The men's coxed pair was one of the original four events in 1900, but was not held in 1904, 1908, or 1912. It returned to the programme after World War I and was held every Games from 1924 to 1992, when it (along with the men's coxed four) was replaced with the men's lightweight double sculls and men's lightweight coxless four.

Competition format

The coxed pair event featured three-person boats, with two rowers and a coxswain. It was a sweep rowing event, with the rowers each having one oar (and thus each rowing on one side). The tournament featured two rounds: semifinals and a final. There were two semifinals, each with 3 or 4 boats; the top two in each advanced to the final. The final was a four-boat race.

The distance for each race was 1750 metres, rather than the 2000 metres which was becoming standard even at the time (and has been used in the Olympics since 1912, except in 1948).

Schedule

Results

Semifinals

The top two boats in each semifinal advanced to the final.

Semifinal 1

Semifinal 2

Final

In the semifinals, the Dutch team had been coxed by Hermanus Brockmann, who weighed 60 kg. They saw that the French teams made use of young light-weighted boys of about 25 kg, and decided to switch coxswains to reduce weight, recruiting a young Parisian boy for the job. In the final, the Dutch team took the lead from the start. In the end, the French team came very close, but the Dutch team won a tight race with the French boat sent by the Marne society.

Results summary

References

External links
 International Olympic Committee medal winners database
 De Wael, Herman. Herman's Full Olympians: "Rowing 1900". Accessed 26 February 2006.
 

Rowing at the 1900 Summer Olympics